is a national highway of Japan connecting the cities of Rikuzentakata, in southeastern Iwate Prefecture, and Hachinohe, in southeastern Aomori Prefecture. It serves primarily as an alternate, inland route to National Route 45 through the northeastern part of the Tōhoku region.

Route description

History
National Route 340 was established by the Cabinet of Japan in 1975 between Rikuzentaka and Hachinohe.

Major intersections
All junctions listed are at-grade intersections unless noted otherwise.

See also

References

External links

National highways in Japan
Roads in Aomori Prefecture
Roads in Iwate Prefecture